The 1841 Census of Ireland was a census that covered the whole island of Ireland. It was conducted as part of the broader 1841 United Kingdom census, which was the first modern census undertaken in the UK. The census is of particular note in Ireland as it was taken shortly before the Great Famine (1845-1852), which resulted in over 1 million deaths and spurred decades of mass emigration. The total population of the island in 1841 was estimated to be just under 8.2 million, which remains the highest recorded population Ireland has ever had. As of the latest censuses - 2022 in the Republic of Ireland and 2021 in Northern Ireland - the island's population stood at just over 7 million, roughly 16% lower than its pre-famine peak.

The original records of the 1821 to 1851 censuses were destroyed by fire at the Four Courts in Dublin during the Irish Civil War, while those between 1861 and 1891 were possibly pulped during the First World War.

Background 
Due to the Population Act 1840, the United Kingdom Census of 1841 was conducted using a different framework from that of earlier United Kingdom censuses. The origins of the Population Act 1840 was the report of the 1830 Select Committee on the Population Bill, reprinted in 1840. The subject of much speculation during the select committee hearings and report was the accuracy of previous census returns, the first national census being held in 1801.

Records

Very few census records for Ireland prior to 1901 survive due to the Irish Public Office being bombed on 30 June 1922. Some of the 1841 Census returns for Killeshandra of County Cavan, Kilcrohane of County Cork, Thurles of County Tipperary and Aghalurcher of County Fermanagh survived.

Results
In 1841 Cork was by far the island's most populous county, with approximately 850,000 residents - almost twice as populous as Galway in second place. Although its population steadily declined for decades following the famine, Cork would remain Ireland's most populous county until the 1901 census, when it was surpassed by Antrim. The least populous county was Carlow, which was also the sole county on the island with less than 100,000 residents. Carlow was consistently recorded as Ireland's least populous county until the 1956 census, when Longford dropped below it.

Dublin was the most urbanised county in Ireland and had a population density of 405 people per square km. It was the only county to record an overall increase in population between 1841 and 1851, while the cities of Cork and Belfast also saw their populations rise in the immediate aftermath of the famine. Partially owing to their mountainous terrain Kerry, Donegal and Wicklow were the island's least densely populated regions.

Legacy
Just 8 of Ireland's 32 counties currently have a population above their recorded 1841 peak as of the latest censuses. Population estimates suggest that the total population of the island peaked in 1845 at around 8.5 million, and would likely have reached 9 million at the 1851 census were it not for the famine. The census recorded that the population of England, Scotland and Wales combined was just over twice that of Ireland, at 18.55 million. By comparison, 2020 estimates place the population of Great Britain at over nine times that of Ireland (65 million vs 6.9 million).

Regional populations

Province

County

References

Notes

Bibliography
 

1841 censuses
1841 in Ireland
1841
June 1841 events